Camp Branch Wetlands Natural Area Preserve is an  Natural Area Preserve located in Floyd County, Virginia.  Privately owned, it was officially dedicated in 2007, and is part of a larger private holding of  protected by a conservation easement held by the Virginia Outdoors Foundation. The preserve is closed to the public.

See also
 List of Virginia Natural Area Preserves

References

External links
Virginia Department of Conservation and Recreation: Camp Branch Wetlands Natural Area Preserve

Virginia Natural Area Preserves
Protected areas of Floyd County, Virginia
Wetlands of Virginia